The Wachenburg is a castle on a hill overlooking Weinheim an der Bergstrasse, in Baden-Württemberg, Germany. It was built between 1907 and 1928 by the Weinheimer Senioren-Convent, a Corps of former students. The castle contains a restaurant with a nice view of the country.

See also 
 Windeck Castle (Weinheim)

Buildings and structures in Weinheim